Koyra Union is a union parishad of Koyra Upazila of Khulna District, in Khulna Division, Bangladesh.

Geography
Koyra Union has an area of 8250 acres (20.5 sq km). Koyra Union is located at the Koyra Sadar of Koyra Upazila. It shares borders with Moharajpur Union to the north, Dakkhin Bedkasi and Kapotaksha River located In the south, To the east Shakbaria River and Sundarbans, to the west are the Kapotaksha River and Shamnagar upazila of Satkhira district.

Educational institutions
 Koyra Madinabad Model Secondary School

References

External links
 

Unions of Koyra Upazila
Populated places in Khulna District